Anthony Ray may refer to:
 Sir Mix-a-Lot (Anthony L. Ray), American rapper, songwriter and record producer
 Anthony Ray (producer), American actor, producer and production manager

See also
 Ray Anthony, American bandleader and musician